Addekoppa  is a village in the southern state of Karnataka, India. It is located in the Gauribidanur taluk of Chikkaballapura district]] in Karnataka.Rashmi Narsimurthy is the sarpanch of the village.Addekoppa is located 3 km from Manchenahalli.Village code of addekoppa is 623418.

See also
 Kolar
 Districts of Karnataka

References

External links
 http://Kolar.nic.in/

Villages in Kolar district